The 2010 WNBA season is the 13th season for the Tulsa Shock franchise of the Women's National Basketball Association. It is their first in Tulsa.

Transactions

Dispersal draft
Based on the Detroit Shock's 2009 record, the Tulsa Shock would pick 7th in the Sacramento Monarchs dispersal draft. The Shock picked Scholanda Robinson.

WNBA Draft
The following are the Shock's selections in the 2010 WNBA Draft.

Transaction log
 March 10: The Shock signed Marion Jones, Natashy Lacy and Iciss Tillis to training camp contracts.
 April 1: The Shock signed Ivory Latta to a training camp contract.
 April 7: The Shock acquired Amber Holt and Chante Black from the Connecticut Sun in exchange for the seventh pick in the 2010 Draft and a second-round pick in the 2011 Draft.
 April 14: The Shock traded Crystal Kelly to the San Antonio Silver Stars in exchange for Shanna Crossley.
 April 26: The Shock signed Juanita Ward, Kim Sitzmann, Danielle Green, Brittany Gilliam and Monique Alexander  to training camp contracts.
 April 28: The Shock signed Christi Thomas.
 April 29: The Shock waived Kim Sitzmann, Monique Alexander, Danielle Green and Brittany Gilliam.
 May 5: The Shock waived Vivian Frieson and Juanita Ward.
 May 11: The Shock released Cheryl Ford.
 May 13: The Shock waived Ivory Latta and Christi Thomas.
 May 14: The Shock waived Olayinka Sanni and Iciss Tillis.
 May 27: The Shock traded Shavonte Zellous to the Indiana Fever in exchange for a second-round pick in the 2011 Draft.
 June 2: The Shock signed Ashley Walker.
 June 8: The Shock waived Amanda Thompson and Ashley Walker and signed Kiesha Brown and Jennifer Lacy.
 June 14: The Shock traded Plenette Pierson to the New York Liberty in exchange for Tiffany Jackson.
 July 23: The Shock traded Kara Braxton to the Phoenix Mercury in exchange for Nicole Ohlde and a first-round pick in the 2011 Draft.
 July 26: The Shock traded Alexis Hornbuckle to the Minnesota Lynx in exchange for Rashanda McCants.

Trades

Free agents

Additions

Subtractions

Roster

Depth

Season standings

Schedule

Preseason

|- align="center" bgcolor="bbffbb"
| 1 || May 9 || 2:00pm || Seattle || 90–80 || Braxton, Holt (14) || Black (8) || Lacy, Pierson (4) || BOK Center  N/A || 1–0
|-

Regular season

|- align="center" bgcolor="ffbbbb"
| 1 || May 15 || 8:00pm || Minnesota || NBATVCOX || 74–80 || Holt (16) || Black (10) || Lacy (5) || BOK Center 7,806 || 0-1
|- align="center" bgcolor="ffbbbb"
| 2 || May 20 || 12:30pm || San Antonio || NBATVFS-OKFS-SW || 74-83 || Braxton (15) || Braxton, Holt (6) || Zellous (4) || BOK Center 4,636 || 0-2
|- align="center" bgcolor="bbffbb"
| 3 || May 23 || 7:00pm || @ Minnesota ||  || 94-82 || Pierson, Zellous (14) || Black (17) || Lacy (7) || Target Center 6,822 || 1-2
|- align="center" bgcolor="ffbbbb"
| 4 || May 25 || 7:00pm || Phoenix || ESPN2 || 96-110 || Holt (20) || Black (12) || Lacy (7) || BOK Center 4,100 || 1-3
|- align="center" bgcolor="bbffbb"
| 5 || May 29 || 8:00pm || Indiana || NBATVFS-OK || 79-74 || Holt (16) || Black (11) || Lacy (5) || BOK Center 4,005 || 2-3
|-

|- align="center" bgcolor="bbffbb"
| 6  || June 4  || 8:00pm || Minnesota || FS-OK || 92-79 || Robinson (20) || Black (11) || Lacy (6) || BOK Center 4,521 || 3-3
|- align="center" bgcolor="ffbbbb"
| 7  || June 5  || 8:00pm || @ Chicago || CN100 || 70-95 || Crossley (20) || Braxton (9) || Lacy (7) || Allstate Arena 4,549 || 3-4
|- align="center" bgcolor="ffbbbb"
| 8  || June 11 || 8:00pm || @ San Antonio ||  || 75-87 || Braxton (14) || Black (9) || Lacy (5) || AT&T Center 7,076 || 3-5
|- align="center" bgcolor="ffbbbb"
| 9  || June 12 || 10:00pm || @ Phoenix ||  || 84-116 || Crossley (17) || Hornbuckle (8) || Braxton, Crossley (4) || US Airways Center 6,580 || 3-6
|- align="center" bgcolor="ffbbbb"
| 10 || June 18 || 8:00pm || @ Minnesota ||  || 67-78 || Brown (14) || Braxton (7) || Crossley, Lacy (3) || Target Center 6,953 || 3-7
|- align="center" bgcolor="ffbbbb"
| 11 || June 19 || 8:00pm || Minnesota || COX || 78-92 || Robinson (14) || Jackson (6) || Hornbuckle, Robinson (4) || BOK Center 5,013 || 3-8
|- align="center" bgcolor="ffbbbb"
| 12 || June 23 || 12:00pm || @ Atlanta || NBATVFS-OKSSO || 90-96 || Robinson (17) || Black (12) || Brown (7) || Philips Arena 9,598 || 3-9
|- align="center" bgcolor="ffbbbb"
| 13 || June 25 || 8:00pm || New York || COX || 78-92 || Lacy (16) || Black (9) || Hornbuckle, Robinson (3) || BOK Center 4,554 || 3-10
|- align="center" bgcolor="ffbbbb"
| 14 || June 27 || 4:00pm || Seattle || COX || 72-83 || Robinson (16) || Jackson (8) || Brown, Jackson, Lacy (3) || BOK Center 4,865 || 3-11
|- align="center" bgcolor="ffbbbb"
| 15 || June 29 || 8:00pm || Connecticut || COX || 89-101 || Robinson (19) || Black (6) || Brown (7) || BOK Center 3,649 || 3-12
|-

|- align="center" bgcolor="ffbbbb"
| 16 || July 3 || 8:00pm || Washington || COX || 54-69 || Robinson (16) || Black, Jackson (5) || Brown (2) || BOK Center 3,516 || 3-13
|- align="center" bgcolor="ffbbbb"
| 17 || July 8  || 7:00pm || @ Indiana || || 72-100 || Holt (18) || Black (12) || Black (5) || Conseco Fieldhouse 7,077 || 3-14
|- align="center" bgcolor="ffbbbb"
| 18 || July 13 || 7:00pm || Los Angeles || ESPN2 || 71-87 || Brown (14) || Braxton (10) || Latta (6) || BOK Center 7,073 || 3-15
|- align="center" bgcolor="bbffbb"
| 19 || July 16 || 8:00pm || @ San Antonio || || 75-70 || Latta (15) || Braxton, Jackson, Lacy (5) || Latta (4) || AT&T Center 9,298 || 4-15
|- align="center" bgcolor="ffbbbb"
| 20 || July 17 || 10:00pm || @ Phoenix || || 88-97 || Robinson (15) || Black (13) || Brown (7) || US Airways Center 8,564 || 4-16
|- align="center" bgcolor="ffbbbb"
| 21 || July 20 || 3:00pm || @ Los Angeles || || 83-86 (OT) || Robinson (19) || Jackson (9) || Latta (7) || STAPLES Center 14,413 || 4-17
|- align="center" bgcolor="ffbbbb"
| 22 || July 22 || 8:00pm || Phoenix || COX || 91-123 || Braxton (18) || Jackson (9) || Latta (6) || BOK Center 3,333 || 4-18
|- align="center" bgcolor="ffbbbb"
| 23 || July 25 || 9:00pm || @ Seattle || KONG || 59-75 || Crossley (19) || Robinson (6) || Brown, Jackson (2) || KeyArena 9,686 || 4-19
|- align="center" bgcolor="ffbbbb"
| 24 || July 27 || 1:30pm || Atlanta || NBATVCOX || 89-105 || Latta (23) || Ohlde (7) || Latta (6) || BOK Center 3,800 || 4-20
|- align="center" bgcolor="ffbbbb"
| 25 || July 30 || 8:00pm || San Antonio || NBATVFS-OK || 85-101 || Latta (19) || Jackson (7) || Brown (5) || BOK Center 5,203 || 4-21
|-

|- align="center" bgcolor="ffbbbb"
| 26 || August 1  || 4:00pm || @ Washington || NBATVCSN-MA || 62-87 || Jackson (14) || Jackson (7) || Brown (3) ||  Verizon Center 9,008 || 4-22
|- align="center" bgcolor="bbffbb"
| 27 || August 3  || 8:00pm || Seattle || COX || 84-75 || Robinson (21) || Jackson (5) || Latta (7) || BOK Center 3,697 || 5-22
|- align="center" bgcolor="ffbbbb"
| 28 || August 6  || 10:30pm || @ Los Angeles || || 70-77 || Latta (16) || Jackson (9) || Ohlde (4) ||  STAPLES Center 8,962 || 5-23
|- align="center" bgcolor="ffbbbb"
| 29 || August 7  || 10:00pm || @ Seattle || KONG || 65-111 || Latta (14) || Jackson (6) || Jackson, Jones, Latta (4) || KeyArena 9,686 || 5-24
|- align="center" bgcolor="ffbbbb"
| 30 || August 13 || 8:00pm || @ San Antonio || || 74-94 || Robinson (14) || Jackson (5) || Latta (5) || AT&T Center 10,244 || 5-25
|- align="center" bgcolor="ffbbbb"
| 31 || August 14 || 8:00pm || Los Angeles || COX || 87-92 || Latta (26) || Jackson (13) || Holt, Latta (4) || BOK Center 5,719 || 5-26
|- align="center" bgcolor="ffbbbb"
| 32 || August 17 || 7:30pm || @ Connecticut ||  || 62-90 || Robinson (18) || Holt (7) || Holt (3) || Mohegan Sun Arena 8,828 || 5-27
|- align="center" bgcolor="ffbbbb"
| 33 || August 19 || 7:30pm || @ New York || || 85-95 || Crossley (21) || Black (9) || Jackson, Robinson (4) ||  Madison Square Garden 8,766 || 5-28
|- align="center" bgcolor="bbffbb"
| 34 || August 21 || 8:00pm || Chicago || NBATVFS-OK || 84-71 || Crossley, Jackson (17) || Jackson (9) || Latta (5) || BOK Center 6,321 || 6-28
|-

Statistics

Regular season

References

Tulsa Shock seasons
Tulsa Shock
Tulsa Shock